Zachary Edwin Dawes (born July 2, 1985) is an American musician, producer, engineer, and technician, best known as the bassist for the bands Mini Mansions and The Last Shadow Puppets.  He has also made contributions to music by Brian Wilson, Lana Del Rey, among other music artists.

Early life
Dawes grew up in Encino, California. He majored in Film & Digital Media at the University of California, Santa Cruz.

As a child, Dawes learned to play the piano, but switched to bass when he discovered that the band he was starting needed a bass player.

Career
Dawes spent many years assisting and playing bass for American record producer T Bone Burnett.  He played bass on albums and soundtracks for which Burnett was producer, composer or contributing artist, including The Hunger Games: Songs from District 12 and Beyond, Inside Llewyn Davis (soundtrack), A Place at the Table, True Detective, season 1 of Nashville (2012 TV series), Lisa Marie Presley's album Storm & Grace, the album Put Your Needle Down by the band The Secret Sisters, and Lost on the River: The New Basement Tapes, a reworking of unfinished songs by Bob Dylan.

He played bass in Slang Chickens, a band that featured current Haim drummer Dash Hutton and former Wires on Fire front man Evan Weiss.

In 2016, Dawes took part in the recording of the debut album of American singer Alexandra Savior, contributing bass, organ, and vibraphone.

In 2019, Dawes was the music supervisor and contributed to the soundtrack for the award-winning film, Peanut Butter Falcon. 

In 2021, Dawes composed the music for the Netflix film There's Someone Inside Your House.

Discography
Appearances on albums
2009 - Mini Mansions – Mini Mansions EP
2011 - Mini Mansions – Mini Mansions
2012 - Nashville – The Music of Nashville: Season 1, Vol 1.
2012 - Lisa Marie Presley – Storm & Grace
2013 - Nashville – The Music of Nashville: Season 1, Vol. 2.
2013 - A Place at the Table – "Original Motion Picture Soundtrack"
2013 - Various Artists – The Music of Grand Theft Auto V
2014 - The Secret Sisters – Put Your Needle Down
2014 - Kimbra – The Golden Echo
2014 - The New Basement Tapes – Lost on the River: The New Basement Tapes
2015 - Brian Wilson – No Pier Pressure
2015 - Mini Mansions – The Great Pretenders
2016 - The Last Shadow Puppets – Everything You've Come to Expect
2016 - Unloved – Guilty of Love
2016 - Mini Mansions – Flashbacks: A Collection of B-Sides From the Great Pretenders
2016 - The Last Shadow Puppets – The Dream Synopsis
2017 - Alexandra Savior – Belladonna of Sadness
2017 - Imelda May – Life Love Flesh Blood
2018 - Kimbra – Primal Heart
2018 - Arctic Monkeys – Tranquility Base Hotel & Casino
2018 - Miles Kane – Coup de Grace
2018 - Mini Mansions – Works Every Time EP
2019 - Sharon Van Etten – Remind Me Tomorrow
2019 - The Peanut Butter Falcon (Original Motion Picture Soundtrack)
2019 - Mini Mansions – Guy Walks Into A Bar...
2019 - Lana Del Rey – Norman Fucking Rockwell
2021 - Lana Del Rey – Blue Banisters
2022 - Sharon Van Etten – We've Been Going About This All Wrong
2023 - Lana Del Rey – Did You Know That There's a Tunnel Under Ocean Blvd

References

1985 births
Living people
American rock bass guitarists
American male bass guitarists
21st-century American bass guitarists
21st-century American male musicians
The Last Shadow Puppets members
University of California, Santa Cruz alumni